The Malia Pendant is a gold pendant found in a tomb in 1930 at Chrysolakkos, Malia, Crete. It dates to the Minoan civilization, 1800-1650 BC. The pendant was excavated by the French and first described by Pierre Demargne. The pendant is commonly called "The Bees of Malia."

The jewel takes the form of two insects, which are identical (mirror images) joined head-to-head with the tips of their abdomens almost touching in a symmetrical or heraldic arrangement. The insects’ wings spread backwards. From the lower edges of the wings and a point close to the tip of the abdomen dangle three discs. With their legs, the insects are "grasping" a centrally placed circular disc and there is a second, smaller, smooth globule placed above this and between the insects' heads as if they were eating it. The Malia Pendant is on display at the Heraklion Archaeological Museum, on the island of Crete in Greece.  It is probably the single most famous piece of Minoan jewellery.

Identity of the Insects
The insects resemble wasps or bees. The belief that the pendant displays bees is the reason the pendant is also known as the “bee pendant”.  One paper states that the insects are not bees, but definitely from the wider grouping of Hymenoptera. It has been proposed that the goldsmith used the mammoth wasp Megascolia maculate as the model. For the three suspending discs, a plant is proposed as the model, and in particular the fruits of Tordylium apulum. Archaeologists point out that Minoan art often distorts forms for artistic effect.

Thematically, the presence of honey is significant, since it was important in Minoan culture.

References

 

Heraklion Archaeological Museum
Individual pendants
Minoan art
Ancient art in metal